The savanna side-necked turtle (Podocnemis vogli), also commonly known as the Llanos side-necked turtle, is a species of turtle in the family Podocnemididae. The species is endemic to South America.

Etymology
The specific name, vogli, is in honor of Father Cornelius Vogl (1884–1959), who was a Benedictine missionary in Venezuela from 1925 to 1959.

Geographic range
Podocnemis vogli is found in the Orinoco river system in the Llanos in Venezuela and Colombia.

References

Further reading
Gotte SW (1992). "Podocnemis vogli ". Catalogue of American Amphibibians and Reptiles 537: 1–2.
Merchán M, Fidalgo AM, Pérez C (2003). "Biologie und Verbreitung von Podocnemis vogli in Venezuela ". Reptilia, Münster 8 (40): 47–49. (in German).
Müller L (1935). "Über eine neue Podocnemis-Art (Podocnemis vogli) aus Venezuela nebst ergänzender Bemerkungen über die systematischen Merkmale der ihr nächstverwandten Arten ". Zoologischer Anzeiger 110: 97–109. (Podocnemis vogli, new species, p. 104). (in German).

Reptiles described in 1935
Podocnemis
Turtles of South America
Fauna of the Amazon
Reptiles of Colombia
Reptiles of Venezuela